James McCusker may refer to:

 Sir James McCusker (banker) (1913–1994), Australian financier and philanthropist
 James Harold McCusker (1940–1990), Northern Ireland Ulster Unionist Party politician
 James L. McCusker (1869–?), American swimmer
 Jim McCusker (American football) (1936–2015), American football defensive tackle
 Jim McCusker (footballer) (born 1939), Northern Irish footballer
 Jim McCusker (trade unionist) (born 1943), Northern Ireland trade union leader